Khaliji music (also spelled Khaleeji;  meaning Gulf music) is the music of Eastern Arabia, the Gulf Arabian states and it is popular across the Arab world. It is traditionally characterized by heavy use of the rebab, oud and other string instruments such as the violin, the occasional use of habbān, and the inclusion of percussion instruments such as the mirwas, tabl, and duff drums. Khaliji music first started as a bedouin tradition with poetry sung by a tribe's shaa'ir, which means poet, usually accompanied by a rebab, the lyrics dealt with tales of honor, love, camel riders, and glory warriors. 

Khaliji music has roots going back more than 1,000 years, to the Islamic period, under the Umayyads and Abbasids in Baghdad, Iraq. In the modern era, Kuwaitis were the first commercial recording artists and composers in the Persian Gulf region; Iraq, Kuwait and Saudi Arabia pioneered the Khaliji genre into its modern form in the second half of the 20th century and soon became the focal point of the industry, but in recent years the UAE has had an arguabely bigger impact with musical artists such as Hussain Al Jassmi, Ahlam, and Mehad Hamad dominating the charts, and their songs represent different music genres, in which many of them are Khaliji. The Khaliji scene is primarily populated by Iraqi, Emirati, Kuwaiti, Bahraini, and Saudi artists today. Along with its main Arabian style, Khaliji music can also sometimes incorporate few elements of East African along with the Arabian genre such as Samri, Liwa, Moradah,and Sawt reflecting the region's ethnic history. 

In recent years, a new Independent scene has started to emerge in the Gulf states that aims to challenge the sociocultural norms of modern Khaleeji society through a sound that's distinct from traditional Khaliji music, the scene has been coined as "Alternative Khaliji" by Kuwaiti-American musician +Aziz.

Khaliji singers

Eastern Arabia

Bahrain
 Salman Hameed
 Abdullah Taki
 Adel Mahmoud
 Ahmed Aljumairy
 Alekhwa Band
 Ali Bahar
 Hala Al Turk
 Hind
 Hussain Faisal
 Khaled El Sheikh
 Salman Ziman
 Herban (singer)

Iraq

 Saif Nabeel
 Waleed Al Shami
 Salah Al Bahar
 Hussam Al Rassam
 Kazem Al Saher
 Osama Al Hamdani
 Muhanned Muhsen
 Reda Abdullah
 Hatem Al Iraqi

 Namir (singer)
 Waleed Al-Shami
 Hussam Kamel
 Adel Al-Mukhtar
 Majid al-Muhandis
 Osama Al Hamdani
 Rahma Riad

Kuwait

 Abas Albadri 
 Abdallah Al Rowaished
 Abdulatif Alkuwaity 
 Abdulkareem Abdulkader
 Abdulla Alfudhalah
 Abdulaziz Althuwaihi
 Abdulmohsen Almuhanna
 Abdulqader Hadhoud
 Abdulrahman Alhuraibi
 Ahmed Alhuraibi
 Aisha Al-Martta
 Aliyah Hussain 
 Awaad Salem  
 Awadh Doukhi 
 +Aziz
 Basem Alradhan
 Bashar Alshatti
 Bashar Sultan
 Daffy 
 Fatat Sultan
 Fatooma
 Fawaz Almarzouq
 Faisal Al-Rashed
 Ghareed Alshati 
 Guitara Band 
 Hamad Almanea
 Houmod Nasser 
 Hussain Jasem
 Khaled bin Hussain 
 Layla Abdulaziz 
 Mahmoud Alkuwaity 
 Miami Band 
 Maram
 Mohammed Albloushi
 Mohammed Almisbah 
 Moustafa Ahmad
 Motref Almotref
 Nabil Shuail
 Nawal El Kuwaitia
 Oudah Almuhanna
 Queen G
 Rabab 
 Rabiha Marzouq
 Rahaf Guitara
 Saleh Alhuraibi
 Saleh and Dawood Alkuwaity 
 Sana Alkharaz
 Shadi Alkhaleej
 Shamayel
 Shams
 Sulaiman Algassar
 Sulaiman Almulla
 Tareq Alkhurayef 
 Yahya Ahmad
 Youssef Al Omani
 Yousef Almotref

Oman
 Salim Rashid Suri
 Salah Al Zadjali

Qatar
 Saud Jassem
 Fahad Al Kubaisi
 Saad Al Fahad

Saudi Arabia

 Tariq Abdulmajid
 Thamer Al-Turki
 Turki (singer)
 Saud Bin Abdullah
 Fahad Al Aibanni
 Rashad El Faris
 Ohud (singer)
 Muhammed Al-Bakery
 Ali Samara
 Fahad Bin Faslan
 Abdulaziz Louis
 Anas Kareem
 Mutlak Al-Dukheel
 Muhammed Al Busaili
 Ghazay Bin Sahab
 Muhammed Sawag
 Ibrahim Al-Dukheel
 Majed Al Raslani
 Hussein Al-Ali
 Faris Mahdi
 Dalia Mubarak
 Bader Al-Leimon
 Basheer Shanaan
 Abu Baker Salem
 Ali Al-Saad
 Al-Ounoud
 Alaa Saad
 Abadi Al-Johar
 Ali Bin Muhammed
 Sahab (singer)
 Yasser Habib
 Saad Al-Fahad
 Rami Abdullah
 Nahwa (singer)
 Muhammed Zailai
 Noura (singer)
 Jaber Al-Kasser
 Khaled Turki
 Jawad Al-Ali
 Hussein Al Omar
 Basheer Hamad Shanan
 Essam Areef
 Abdulaziz Al-Mansour
 Abdulaziz Eliass
 Abdullah Rashad
 Abdullah Al-Iddriss
 Ali Abdul-Satar
 Ayed Youssef
 Um Talal
 Abadi Al-Johar
 Abass Ibrahim
 Abdul Majeed Abdullah
 Aseel Abu Bakr
 Aseel Omran
 Ayed (Khaliji Musician)
 Dalia Mubarak
 Etab
 Ibtisam Lutfi
 Ismail Mubarak
 Khalid Abdulrahman
 Mohammed Abdu
 Qusai (musician)
 Rabeh Sager
 Ramy Abdullah
 Rashed Al-Majed
 Sahab (Singer)
 Talal Maddah
 Talal Salama
 Ali Abdul Karim
 Abdel Hadi Hussein
 Abdullah Salman
 Bahaa Sultan
 Dhawi
 Farfashah
 Hani Al Ahdal
 Ibrahim El Tamimi
 Naif El Badar
 Muhammed Yousef Jassem
 Rimas
 Raghad
 Rena
 Saleh Saad
 Salah Ahmad Khalifah
 Aseel Abu Baker

United Arab Emirates

 Turki Al-Shaabi
 Muhammed Murshad
 Muhammed Al-Saeed
 Mohammed Saeed Harib
 Hamid El Jissmi
 Al-Shab Said
 Muhammed Al-Hamili
 Reem (singer)
 Faiz Said
 Badoor (singer)
 Abdullah Al-Salman
 Ahmad Al Mala
 Ahmad Ibrahim
 Alaa Al-Shahri
 Al-Makabeel (singer)
 Abdullah Bilkher
 Waleed Ibrahim
 Ahlam
 Ahmad Al-Mala
 Ahmad Ibrahim
 Eida Al Menhali
 Hussain Al Jasmi
 Mehad Hamad
 Reem Al Mahmoudi
 Samar (singer)
 Shamma Hamdan
 Fatoon
 Hamsa

Other Arab Countries

Algeria
 Fulla
 Warda Al-Jazairia
 Fella Ababsa

Jordan
 Diana Karazon
 Omar Al-Abdallat
 Saba Mubarak
 Mohammed Ramadan

Egypt

 Abdel Halim Hafez
 Samir Jadd
 Ramy Jamal
 Jamal Ahmad
 Faris (singer)
 Tamer Ashour
 Ahmad Maki
 Saad Al-Sagheer
 Mohamed Henedi
 Ahmad Al-Essawi
 Walid Al-Hakim
 Shihab Housni
 Ahmad Al-Essawi
 Angham
 Umm Kulthum
 Carmen Suleiman
 Hakim (Egyptian singer)
 Shaaban Abdel Rahim
 ZeeZee Adel
 Anoushka (Egyptian singer)
 Laila Ghofran
 May Kassab
 Sherine Wagdy
 Mohammed Hamaki
 Moustafa Amar
 Khaled Selim
 May Matar
 Wael Munir
 Hamada Halal
 Muhammed Fouad
 Najah Salam
 Ahmed Saad
 Hany Shaker
 Mohamed Mounir
 Muhammed Mahai
 Madhad Saleh
 Shima Said
 Khalid Aggag
 Ehab Tawfik
 Yousra (Egyptian singer)
 Tamer Hosny

Lebanon

 Bilal (Lebanese singer)
 Wassam Al-Amir
 Samir Kabru
 Iwan (singer)
 Layla Iskander
 Ihab Yaghi
 Alessa (singer)
 Ziad Barji
 Naya (singer)
 Natasha (singer)
 Nadi Shamali
 Moeen Charif
 Halah Hadi
 Adam (singer)
 Wael Mansour
 Grace Deeb
 Assi El Hallani
 Diana Haddad
 Dina Hayek
 Julia Boutros
 Nawal Al Zoghbi
 Bassima (singer)
 Wael Kfoury
 Fares Karam
 Najwa Karam
 Fairuz
 Ramy Ayach
 Wael Jassar
 Walid Toufic
 Joseph Attieh
 Melhem Zain
 Alaa Zalzali
 Suzanne Tamim
 Nasri Shamseddine
 Ziad Rahbani
 Wadih El Safi
 Georges Al Rassi
 Marcel Khalife
 Melhem Barakat
 Ahmad Kaabour
 Karter Zaher
 Yasmine Hamdan
 Chantal Bitar
 Najwa Sultan
 Nahwa (singer)
 Simona Daou
 Madeleine Matar
 Haithem Shaker
 Rabia Al Asmer
 Nay Sulaiman
 Zain El Omr
 Fadhl Shaker

Libya
 Ayman Alatar

Morocco

 Jannat
 Morad El Gzanay
 Hoda Saad
 Douzy (singer)
 Asma Lamnawar
 Dounia Batma
 Rajae Belmlih
 Salma Rachid
 Shatha Hassoun
 Larbi Batma
 Hamid Bouchnak
 Saida Fikri
 Abdessadeq Cheqara
 Ahmed Soultan
 Houcine Slaoui
 Ammouri Mbarek
 Said Senhaji
 Mohamed Rouicha
 Jamilla
 Mona Amarsha
 Morad El Gzanay
 Tarik Bardad 
 Younis Al Rabat
 Abdel Fatah Al Gharini
 Fadwa Al-Maliki
 Samar Abdulaziz

Syria
 Rania Shalhoub
 Sary Al-Sawas
 Assala Nasri
 George Wassouf
 Rouwaida Attieh
 Wadee Murad
 Eyad Saqr
 Majd Al-Kassem
 Rami Mousa

Tunisia
 Latifa
 Saber Rebaï
 Shayma Helali 
 Thekra
 Oumaima Talib
 Yusra Mahnoosh
 Amani Swissi
 Zaza (singer)

Yemen
 Abu Bakr Salem Belfkih
 Arwa (singer)
 Balqees Ahmed Fathi
 Fouad Abdulwahed
 Ahmed Fathi 
 Suha Al-Masri

Palestine
 Muhammed Assaf
 Hanna Al Haj Hassan
 Jamil Murad
 Fadee Andrawos
 Mohammed Assaf
 Toni Qattan
 Nabil Salameh
 Mohammad Al Saleh

Other Countries

France

 Faudel
 Rachid Taha
 Najim
 Natacha Atlas
 Amal Wehbe
 Cheba Maria
 Cheb Mami
 Cheb Faris El Sataifi

Spain
 Hakim (Spanish singer)

Greece

 Grigoris Asikis
 Konstantinos Argyros
 Yiorgos Batis
 George Dalaras
 Anestis Delias
 Stratos Pagioumtzis
 Giorgos Xylouris
 Babis Tsertos
 Mariza Koch

United Kingdom
 Yusuf Islam
 Sami Yusuf

Iran

 Evin Agassi
 Nematollah Aghasi
 Hooshmand Aghili
 Salar Aghili
 Morteza Ahmadi
 Alireza Assar
 Davood Azad
 Mohsen Chavoshi
 Farman Fathalian
 Farzad Fattahi
 Babak Jahanbakhsh
 Shahrum Kashani
 Ehsan Khajeh Amiri
 Ali Lohrasbi
 Morteza Pashaei
 Rahim Shahriari
 Reza Yazdani
 Mohsen Yeganeh
 Sima Bina
 Leila Forouhar
 Googoosh
 Mahasti
 Marjan (singer)
 Giti Pashaei

Israel
 Etti Ankri
 Zohra Al Fassiya
 Yael Naim

Cyprus
 Hovig Demirjian

References 

Arab culture
Bahraini music
Kuwaiti music
Emirati music
Qatari music
Omani music
Iraqi music
Saudi Arabian music